Kristen Viikmäe (born 10 February 1979) is an Estonian former professional footballer who played as a striker. He now plays beach soccer.

Club career
Born in Tallinn, Viikmäe started his career with FC Flora Tallinn, and has since played for Tallinna Jalgpallikool, Tallinna Sadam, Vålerenga, Enköpings SK, Fredrikstad, Gefle IF and Jönköpings Södra IF. January 2010 he moved to Panegialios F.C., a third division team in Greece. He left the club in September because of salary problems. In January 2011 he joined JK Nõmme Kalju. On 9 October 2012, he scored the winning goal in a 1–0 victory against FC Kuressaare, which secured JK Nõmme Kalju's first ever title. After the match, Viikmäe announced his intention to retire at the end of the season. He scored in his last match on 5 November 2012.

International career
During his Estonia national team career Viikmäe was capped 115 times and scored 15 goals. He made his debut on 26 January 1997 in a friendly against Lebanon, replacing Andres Oper in the second half. On 30 May 2006, at the age of 27 years and 109 days, Viikmäe became the youngest European footballer to reach 100 caps, which was beaten by German striker Lukas Podolski (27 years and 13 days) during Euro 2012. His testimonial match for the national team, as with all Estonians who are capped more than 100 times during their career, was held on 3 June 2013 against Belarus.

Post-retirement career
Viikmäe became the head of youth department at JK Nõmme Kalju after his retirement.

Career statistics 
Scores and results list Estonia's goal tally first, score column indicates score after each Viikmäe goal.

Honours
Individual
 Estonian Silverball: 2004

See also
 List of men's footballers with 100 or more international caps

References

External links

1979 births
Living people
Footballers from Tallinn
Estonian footballers
Estonia international footballers
FC Flora players
Meistriliiga players
FIFA Century Club
Estonian expatriate footballers
Expatriate footballers in Norway
Estonian expatriate sportspeople in Norway
Vålerenga Fotball players
Fredrikstad FK players
Expatriate footballers in Sweden
Estonian expatriate sportspeople in Sweden
Enköpings SK players
Gefle IF players
Jönköpings Södra IF players
Allsvenskan players
Eliteserien players
Expatriate footballers in Greece
Estonian expatriate sportspeople in Greece
Nõmme Kalju FC players
Estonian beach soccer players
Panegialios F.C. players
Association football forwards